The Rabari people (also known as Desai, Rabari, Raika, and Dewasi people) are an ethnic group from the Rajasthan also found in Gujarat Kutch region and Sindh region of Pakistan.

Origin Myth
The Rabari myth of origin is kshatriya that Shiva put them on earth to tend to the camels owned by Parvati.

Rabaris claim to be originally from Arabs, travelling via Afghanistan to Balochistan, (Pakistan), where there still is a temple of the Charani Goddess Hinglaj who they worship. According to Sigrid Westphal-Helbusch, the significant migrations of Rabaris took place between 12th to 14th century, when they moved from Marwar to Sindh (Pakistan) and Kutch. The migrations of Rabaris in fact follow similar paths as that of Rajputs and Charans, two other migrant group in this region, indicating intertwined histories. Westphal-Helbusch ascribes the goddess worship traditions of Rabaris to the Charan influence.

References

Bibliography 
....

Further reading 
 
 Mirella Ferrera, People of the world. Published by VMB publisher 13100 Vercelli, Italy 2005
 

Modern nomads
Social groups of Gujarat
Maldhari communities
Social groups of Rajasthan